Premium Records was an American record label established in Chicago in 1950 by Lee Egalnick, who had previously run Miracle Records.  Lew Simpkins, who had also worked at Miracle, joined Premium soon afterwards.

Its recording artists included Memphis Slim, Miff Mole, Eddie Chamblee, Lynn Hope, Sarah McLawler, Terry Timmons, Jesse Cryor, and Tab Smith.  The label folded in mid-1951.  Simpkins went on to form United Records, and the Premium label's master recordings were bought by Chess Records.

References

American record labels
Blues record labels
Jazz record labels
Record labels disestablished in 1951
Record labels established in 1950
Rhythm and blues record labels
1950 establishments in Illinois
Companies based in Chicago
1951 disestablishments in Illinois